Alex Prud’homme (born 1961) is an American journalist and the author of several non-fiction books.

Early life and education 
Prud'homme is a native of New York City, a 1984 graduate of Middlebury College, and attended the Bread Loaf Writers' Conference.

Writings 
Prud'homme's journalism has appeared in many publications, including The New York Times, The New Yorker, Vanity Fair, Talk, Time, and People.

Prud'homme collaborated with his great aunt Julia Child on the book My Life in France (Alfred A. Knopf, 2006), her memoir of discovering food and life in postwar Paris and Marseille. The book became a number one New York Times best-seller, and inspired half of the movie Julie & Julia, starring Meryl Streep as Julia Child. In 2007, the book won the Literary Food Writing award from the International Association of Culinary Professionals (IACP).

Prud'homme previously wrote, with co-author Michael Cherkasky, Forewarned (Random House, 2003), about terrorism. He followed that with The Cell Game (HarperCollins, 2004), about the ImClone scandal; The Ripple Effect: The Fate of Fresh Water in the Twenty-First Century (Scribner, 2011); and Hydrofracking: What Everyone Needs to Know (Oxford University Press, 2014).

Returning to Julia Child a decade after her memoir, Prud'homme wrote The French Chef in America: Julia Child's Second Act (Alfred A. Knopf, 2016). The paperback is now available (Anchor Books, 2017).

With photo curator Katie Pratt, he published France is a Feast: the Photographic Journey of Paul and Julia Child, a selection of Paul Child's photographs from 1948 to 1954 (Thames & Hudson, 2017).
 
In 2023, he published Dinner With The President: Food, Politics, and a History of Breaking Bread at the White House.

See also
Water crisis

References

External links
 

American male journalists
1960s births
Living people
Middlebury College alumni
20th-century American journalists
American food writers